Draghoula is a 1995 film directed by Bashar Shbib. A tribute to the high concept trashiness of B-movies, the film centres on Harry (Chriss Lee), a scientist who is trying to locate the gene that controls guilt, but transforms into a combination vampire and drag queen after being bitten by one of his lab rats.

Lee, a musician with the band Talamasca, was cast in the lead role after Shbib saw his performance in a vampire-themed rock concert.

The film was subsequently screened on Showcase in 2001 as a Hallowe'en special.

References

External links 
 

1995 films
English-language Canadian films
1995 horror films
Canadian comedy horror films
Canadian LGBT-related films
1995 LGBT-related films
LGBT-related horror films
Canadian vampire films
Drag (clothing)-related films
Films directed by Bashar Shbib
1990s English-language films
1990s Canadian films